{{DISPLAYTITLE:C17H24O}}
The molecular formula C17H24O (molar mass: 244.37 g/mol, exact mass: 244.1827 u) may refer to:

 Falcarinol, also known as carotatoxin or panaxynol

Molecular formulas